Lesticus nigerrimus is a species of ground beetle in the subfamily Pterostichinae. It was described by Straneo in 1953.

References

Lesticus
Beetles described in 1953